JGO may refer to:

 Jupiter Ganymede Orbiter, a proposed European space probe
 Jetsgo, a defunct airline of Canada
 JETGO Australia, an Australian regional airline
 Ngomba language, a Grassfields language of Cameroon
 Qeqertarsuaq Heliport, in Greenland